Main Mulayam Singh Yadav is a 2021 Indian Hindi-language biographical film directed by Suvendu Raj Ghosh. The film shows the political journey of Mulayam Singh Yadav. Produced by Meena Sethi Mondal, it stars Amyth Sethi, Govind Namdeo, Mukesh Tiwari, Prakash Belawadi, Supriya Karnik, Sayaji Shinde, Rajkumar Kanojia, Zarina Wahab, Anupam Shyam, and Mimoh Chakraborty. This film was initially set to release on 14 August 2020 but was postponed to 2 October. The film release was further delayed due to the COVID-19 pandemic and was theatrical released on 29 January 2021.

Cast 
 Amyth Sethi as Mulayam Singh Yadav
Sana Amin Sheikh as Malti Mulayam Singh Yadav
 Govind Namdeo as Chaudhary Charan Singh
 Mukesh Tiwari as Nathuram
 Prakash Belawadi as Ram Manohar Lohia
 Supriya Karnik as Indira Gandhi
Kiran Jhangiani as Sanjay Gandhi
Ranojoy Bishnu as Ajit Singh
 Sayaji Shinde as Advocate Lakhan Singh
 Rajkumar Kanojia as Darshan Singh
 Mimoh as Shivpal Singh Yadav
Prerna Sethi Mandal as Sarla Shivpal Yadav
Gopal Singh as Ramgopal Yadav
 Zarina Wahab as Mulayam Singh Yadav's mother
 Anupam Shyam as Mulayam Singh Yadav's father
Debdas as Ramroop
Vimal Bhatia as Devkant Barua
Chittrali Das as Kamla Devi Yadav/Chutki (Mulayam Singh Yadav's sister)
Mahima Gupta as Maya Tyagi
Harshat Miami as Siddhartha Shankar Ray

References

External links 
 
 Mulayam singh yadav passed away 

2020s Hindi-language films
2021 films
Indian biographical films
2020s biographical films
Cultural depictions of Indira Gandhi
Cultural depictions of prime ministers of India
Memorials to Chaudhary Charan Singh
Memorials to Ram Manohar Lohia
Nehru–Gandhi family